Hafsatu Ajoke Muhammed is a Nigerian conservationist and the fourth First Lady of Nigeria. She is the widow of Murtala Ramat Muhammed who was Nigerian Head of State from 29 July 1975 to 13 February 1976.

Biography
She was born on 23 May 1941 in British Nigeria. Ajoke Muhammed married Murtala Muhammed in 1963.

She trained as a dental therapist but developed an interest in plants. She set up the Murtala Muhammed Memorial Botanical Garden, a 30-hectare garden along the Lekki–Epe Expressway in Lagos in 1991. She also owns a 20-hectare garden in Abuja named Sarius Palmetum and Botanic Garden. 

She has 5 living children and launched the Murtala Muhammed Foundation in memory of her husband alongside his family.

References

First Ladies of Nigeria
Conservationists
Horticulturists
Year of birth missing (living people)
Living people